Sérgio Malta de Oliveira (born March 9, 1990), better known by his stage name INGEK is a Brazilian DJ and record producer.

Career 
INGEK started his music career at the age of 23, while finishing his Business degree from IBMEC, Brazil. He was introduced first time music industry as a DJ in 2013. His interest turned into passion when he met Felipe Ramos, known as FTampa, in Belo Horizonte.

His productions entered the repertoire of other DJs such as, Benny Benassi, Michael Woods, Starkiller, FTampa, Felguk and many more.

Discography
Take Control (Original Mix) – Felguk, INGEK
I Don't Give A $h*t (Original Mix) 2018 – Almanac & INGEK 
Sincero Abraço (Original Mix) 2018 – INGEK & Dias de Truta & Lorena Diniz
Wakanda (Original Mix) – KZN & INGEK
Steve Aoki & Afrojack 2018 – No Beef – INGEK & KZN Bootleg
Swedish House Mafia One 2018 – INGEK Bootleg
Like Home (INGEK Remix) 2018 – Felguk, Beowülf
FIRE126 – Generate (Bootleg) – INGEK & Illicit Land
La Pump Cast (Ep. 3) – INGEK

References

External links

Brazilian Internet celebrities
Brazilian DJs
Brazilian house musicians
Electro house musicians
People from Divinópolis
Living people
1990 births
Electronic dance music DJs